The International Association of Business Communicators (IABC) is a global network of communications professionals.

Each summer, IABC hosts a World Conference, a three-day event with professional development seminars and activities, as well as talks by industry leaders.

Decisions within the organization are made by a two-thirds vote of the executive board, which is elected by members. IABC members agree to follow a professional code of ethics, which encourages members to do what is legal, ethical and in good taste.

History
IABC's predecessor was the American Association of Industrial Editors (AAIE), which was founded in 1938. AAIE became a member of the International Council of Industrial Editors (ICIE) in 1941. It withdrew from ICIE in 1946 over policy differences, but formed IABC when it merged again in 1970. In IABC's first year of operation, the association had 2,280 members and was focused on internal communications. IABC's research showed its members were moving into positions with broader public relations responsibilities and the association expanded its scope. In 1974 it merged with Corporate Communicators Canada.

In 1982 the association formed the IABC Research Foundation, which funded a study of 323 organizations in the 1980s to determine what made some public relations teams more effective than others. The study found that executive involvement in communications was the best predictor of effectiveness. The Research Foundation also looked into the status and pay of women in the public relations field, in a pioneering study called The Velvet Ghetto.

IABC had financial troubles in 2000 after losing $1 million in an e-business initiative called TalkingBusinessNow. In 2001 a grass-roots initiative was started within IABC's membership that eventually developed into the Gift of Communication program, whereby members donated their professional services to local charities. Membership grew 79 percent each year in the 2000s due to an increasing number of practitioners in the field of internal communications. IABC hosted its first annual world conference in 2005 and grew to more than 16,000 members by 2008. That same year, IABC accredited Chinese citizens for the first time in the Accredited Business Communicator (ABC) program.

In 2009 the IABC Research Foundation conducted a survey that found 79 percent of respondents frequently use social media to communicate with employees. It also co-authored a study the following year that found email and intranet were the most common internal communications tools among respondents.

For 40 years, the association offered an accreditation program called Accreditation for Business Communications (ABC). By the time the program ended in 2013, a total of 1,003 people had earned ABC status. Though the program stopped accepting new applicants in September 2012, ABCs will be recognized as long as they maintain their membership in IABC. A new professional certification program to replace accreditation with a more affordable, computer-based process was proposed in January 2013.  The goal is to set an international standard for all communications professionals that will be recognized by an organization such as ISO17024. The autonomous international group to oversee the creation of the new certification program — the Global Communication Certification Council — was appointed in February 2014.

Organization
IABC offers professional, corporate, student and retired memberships. Representatives from different chapters and regions, as well as professional members, vote at the Annual General Meeting to elect members to the international executive board. The board can change dues, establish new chapters, create workgroups and remove members with a two-thirds vote. IABC also has various committees focused on ethics, research, finance, auditing and others. All positions within IABC are filled by volunteers.

IABC has more than 100 chapters worldwide in North America, Africa, Asia Pacific, and Europe.

Services
IABC hosts networking events and mentoring programs to help recent graduates connect with working public relations, marketing and corporate communications professionals. Most professional members join IABC to further their career advancement, professional development and to grow their professional network. IABC is no longer accepting new applicants for its Accredited Business Communicator (ABC) program, but a new certification program has been initiated that would involve computerized testing and renewals every three years. The new certification program will have two levels; the first level being developed is for Communications Generalists.

IABC publishes a code of ethics, which has three principles: that professional communications be legal, ethical and in good taste. It says members should be sensitive to cultural values, as well as be truthful, accurate and respectful. Before 1995, the code said "Communicators should encourage frequent communication and messages that are honest in their content, candid, accurate and appropriate to the needs of the organization and its audiences."

IABC hosts the Gold Quill Awards, which are bestowed at three levels: Gold, Silver and Bronze. The Gold Quill is an international awards program that's open to both members and non- members.  The Silver and Bronze Quills are conducted at a local chapter level and open to both members and non-members. The awards are bestowed for "creatively and effectively communicating" in measurable ways that contribute to the local community. In 2014 the Gold Quill has four divisions and more than 40 categories. Both the Gold Quill and some of the regional chapters offer special awards for college students.

IABC's goal is to connect and inspire each other through events and professional development programmes, and by sharing best practices. 

IABC inaugural edition of its Regional Conference for business communicators in Asia-Pacific region was held in 2017 in Singapore. The theme of the conference was – FUSION: Connecting Communicators. Asia-Pacific is one of the most culturally and geographically diverse regions in IABC. Goal is to Connect Communicators across the APAC region and the world to inspire, create connections, foster best practices, and promote leadership in the communications profession. Ashwani Singla, Vice President of the IABC India chapter board former APAC board member of Burson-Marsteller, amongst the speakers at Fusion

World conference locations

Fellows 
The IABC Fellow designation is the highest honor IABC bestows on its members. Becoming a Fellow denotes a body of achievement by a communicator who has had a significant impact not only on their organization and IABC, but also on the communication profession at large.

The criteria for Fellow nominations:
 Contribution to the communication profession
 Career achievement
 Authorship, speaking and lecturing
 Contributions to the community

Abbreviations used in the above list:
 ABC - Accredited Business Communicator
 MC - Master Communicator
 SCMP - Strategic Communication Management Professional (SCMP®)
 CMP - Communication Management Professional (CMP®)

Publishing 

IABC also publishes a monthly digital magazine Communication World. Recent issues have shared researched and first-person, expert articles on connecting with Millennials, social intranets and crisis communications.

References

External links
 Official website
 Gold Quill Awards website
 GuideStar profile page

Companies based in San Francisco
Business and finance professional associations
Professional titles and certifications
Public relations
Organizations established in 1970
Communications and media organizations based in the United States